Richard Walpole (born 10 December 1927) was an Australian cross-country skier. He competed in the men's 15 kilometre event at the 1960 Winter Olympics.

References

1927 births
Living people
Australian male cross-country skiers
Olympic cross-country skiers of Australia
Cross-country skiers at the 1960 Winter Olympics
Place of birth missing (living people)
20th-century Australian people